The euplotid nuclear code (translation table 10) is the genetic code used by Euplotidae. The euplotid code is a socalled "symmetrical code", which results from the symmetrical distribution of the codons. This symmetry allows for arythmic exploration of the codon distribution. In 2013, shCherbak and Makukov, reported that "the patterns are shown to match the criteria of an intelligent signal."

The code

   AAs  = FFLLSSSSYY**CCCWLLLLPPPPHHQQRRRRIIIMTTTTNNKKSSRRVVVVAAAADDEEGGGG
Starts = -----------------------------------M----------------------------
 Base1 = TTTTTTTTTTTTTTTTCCCCCCCCCCCCCCCCAAAAAAAAAAAAAAAAGGGGGGGGGGGGGGGG
 Base2 = TTTTCCCCAAAAGGGGTTTTCCCCAAAAGGGGTTTTCCCCAAAAGGGGTTTTCCCCAAAAGGGG
 Base3 = TCAGTCAGTCAGTCAGTCAGTCAGTCAGTCAGTCAGTCAGTCAGTCAGTCAGTCAGTCAGTCAG

Bases: adenine (A), cytosine (C), guanine (G) and thymine (T) or uracil (U).

Amino acids: Alanine (Ala, A), Arginine (Arg, R), Asparagine (Asn, N), Aspartic acid (Asp, D), Cysteine (Cys, C), Glutamic acid (Glu, E), Glutamine (Gln, Q), Glycine (Gly, G), Histidine (His, H), Isoleucine (Ile, I), Leucine (Leu, L), Lysine (Lys, K), Methionine (Met, M), Phenylalanine (Phe, F), Proline (Pro, P), Serine (Ser, S), Threonine (Thr, T), Tryptophan (Trp, W), Tyrosine (Tyr, Y), Valine (Val, V)

Differences from the standard code

Systematic range
 Ciliata: Euplotidae

See also 
 List of genetic codes

References

Molecular genetics
Gene expression
Protein biosynthesis